David Kennedy, 3rd Lord Kennedy and 1st Earl of Cassilis (After 1463 – 9 September 1513) was a Scottish peer, the son of John Kennedy, 2nd Lord Kennedy. He was born about 1463, in Maybole, Ayrshire, Scotland. He was a Privy Councillor of King James IV and was created Earl of Cassilis by him in 1502. Killed at the Battle of Flodden, on 9 September 1513.

Family
David Kennedy married Agnes Borthwick, daughter of William Borthwick, 3rd Lord Borthwick. Their son, Gilbert, 2nd Earl of Cassilis (29 Sep 1494 – 27 Aug 1527) married Isabella Campbell daughter of Archibald Campbell, 2nd Earl of Argyll. Their daughter Katherine married William Hamilton of Sorn and Sanquhar.

After Agnes died David married Margaret Boyd, widow of Alexander Forbes and daughter of Sir Thomas Boyd, Earl of Arran and Mary Stewart, Countess of Arran, daughter of King James II of Scotland, but they had no children. Margaret Boyd is sometimes confused with Marion Boyd, daughter of Thomas Boyd, 6th Earl of Arran who was born 69 years after David died.

References

1513 deaths
Deaths at the Battle of Flodden
Earls of Cassilis
Year of birth uncertain
15th-century Scottish people
16th-century Scottish people
David
1463 births